A snowman is a temporary sculpture made of snow.

Snowman or snowmen may also refer to:

Arts and media

Fictional characters
 Snowman (comics), a Batman villain
 The protagonist in Margaret Atwood's Oryx and Crake
 The Snowman (Courage the Cowardly Dog), the villain in Courage the Cowardly Dog
 Blue Snowman, a fictional villain who appeared in DC Comics' adventures of Wonder Woman
 Snowman, the nickname of Cledus Snow in the Smokey and the Bandit film series, played by Jerry Reed

Film and television
 The Snowman, a 1982 animated television special based on the book by Raymond Briggs
 The Snowman and the Snowdog, a 2012 animated television special based on the 1982 film The Snowman by Raymond Briggs
 Der Schneemann, a 1944 German film
 Snowmen (film), a 2010 American film
 "The Snowmen", a 2012 episode of Doctor Who
 The Snowman (2017 film), a British crime drama film

Literature
 "The Snowman" (fairy tale), a fairy tale by Hans Christian Andersen
 The Snowman (book), a 1978 children's book by Raymond Briggs
 The Snowman (Nesbø novel), a crime novel by Jo Nesbø
 The Snowman, horror novel by R. L. Stine
 The Snowman, Charles Haldeman 1965
 The Snowman, Arthur Maling 1973
 The Snow Man, a poem by Wallace Stevens

Music
Snowman (band), a band from Perth, Australia
Snowman (album), their self-titled album
"Snowman" (April song)
"Snowman" (Sia song)
"Snowman", a song by Anti-Nowhere League from We Are...The League, 1982
"Snowman", the closing track on XTC's album English Settlement
"Snowman", a track taken from a film The Snowman covered by Rainbow on the album Bent Out of Shape
Snow Man, a Japanese boy band
The Snowmen, an English band known for their Christmas recording of "Hokey Cokey"

People
 Daniel Snowman (born 1938), British historian
 Emanuel Snowman (1886-1970), English jeweller
 Isaac Snowman (1874–1947), English artist, brother of Emanuel
 Jacob Snowman (1871–1959), English medical doctor
 Kenneth Snowman (1919–2002), English jeweller, son of Emanuel
 Nicholas Snowman (born 1944), English arts administrator, son of Kenneth
 "The snowman", a nickname of convicted spy Andrew Daulton Lee (born 1952)
 Snowman, a nickname of rapper Young Jeezy (born 1977)
 Snowman, the nickname of American MMA fighter Jeff Monson (born 1971)
 The Snowman, a professional wrestler from the United States Wrestling Association

Other uses
 "The snowman asteroid", shape of the trans-Neptunian object 486958 Arrokoth
 Snowman (horse), a show jumping champion horse
 Snowman or eight-ender, a perfect score in one end of a curling match

See also
 
 
 Yeti, also known as the "Abominable Snowman"